On 5 April 1970, during production of The Man Who Skied Down Everest, six Nepalese Sherpas died on Mount Everest. The deaths were caused by an ice-fall avalanche in the Khumbu Icefall. The icefall, which lies between Base Camp and Camp I, has been the site of numerous fatalities, including those in the 2014 Mount Everest ice avalanche. The Sherpas were assisting the Japanese Skiing Expedition, which included Yūichirō Miura, the first person to ski down Everest. Their names were Mima Norbu, Nima Dorje, Tshering Tarkey, Pasang, Kunga Norbu, and Kami Tshering. Another death occurred in the Japanese expedition four days later when Kyak Tsering was killed by ice falling from a serac.

See also
The Man Who Skied Down Everest
 List of deaths on the Eight Thousanders
 1974 French Mount Everest expedition (French West ridge expedition)
List of Mount Everest expeditions
2014 Mount Everest ice avalanche

References

Mountaineering disasters
1970
1970 in Nepal
1970 natural disasters
Natural disasters in Nepal
April 1970 events in Asia
Avalanches in Nepal
Mount Everest expeditions
1970s avalanches
1970 disasters in Nepal